Phanes  (genitive ) or Protogonus  was the mystic primeval deity of procreation and the generation of new life, who was introduced into Greek mythology by the Orphic tradition; other names for this Classical Greek Orphic concept included Ericapaeus  and Metis ("thought").

Mythology

Orphic cosmogony 
In Orphic cosmogony, Phanes is often equated with Eros or Mithras, and has been depicted as a deity emerging from a cosmic egg, entwined with a serpent. He had a helmet and had broad, golden wings. The Orphic cosmogony is quite unlike the creation sagas offered by Homer and Hesiod. Scholars have suggested that Orphism is "un-Greek" even "Asiatic" in conception, because of its inherent dualism.

Chronos (Time) is said to have created the silver egg of the universe, out of which burst the first-born deity Phanes, or Phanes-Dionysus. Phanes was a male God, in an original Orphic hymn he is named as "Lord Priapos" although others consider him androgynous. Phanes was a deity of light and goodness, whose name meant "to bring light" or "to shine"; a first-born deity, he emerged from the abyss and gave birth to the universe. Nyx (Night) is variously said to be Phanes' daughter or older wife, she is the female counterpart of Phanes, and she is considered by Aristophanes as the first deity. According to Aristophanes, in a play where Phanes is called ‘Eros’, Phanes was born from an egg created by the first deity Nyx and placed in the boundless lap of Erebus, after which he mates with Chaos and creates the flying creatures.

Many threads of earlier myths are apparent in the new tradition. Phanes was believed to have been hatched from the World-Egg of Chronos (Time) and Ananke (Necessity or Fate) or Nyx in the form of a black bird and wind. His older wife Nyx called him Protogenus. As she created nighttime, Phanes created daytime, and also invented the method of creation by mingling. He was made the ruler of the deities. This new Orphic tradition states that Phanes passed the sceptre to Nyx; Nyx later gave the sceptre to her son Ouranos; Cronus seized the scepter from his father Ouranos; and finally the scepter held by Cronus was seized by Zeus, who holds it at present. Some Orphic myths suggest that Zeus intends to pass the scepter to Dionysus.

Protogonos Theogony
The "Protogonos Theogony" is known through the commentary in the Derveni papyrus and references in Empedocles and Pindar.

According to Damascius, Phanes was the first god "expressible and acceptable to human ears" ("").

Another Orphic hymn states:

You scattered the dark mist that lay before your eyes and, flapping your wings, you whirled about, and throughout this world you brought pure light. For this I call you Phanes, I call you Lord Priapos, I call you sparkling with bright eyes.

The Derveni Papyrus refers to Phanes:

Of the First-born king, the reverend one; and upon him all the immortals grew, blessed gods and goddesses and rivers and lovely springs and everything else that had then been born; and he himself became the sole one".

Dionysus or Zagreus of the Orphic tradition is intimately connected to Protogonos. In Orphic Hymn 30, he is given a list of epithets that also allude to Protogonos:

Death and resurrection of Phanes

In the Orphic tradition, Dionysus-Protogonos-Phanes is a dying and rising god.
Eusebius tells us the story of his death and recreation:
 The Titans boil the dismembered limbs of Dionysus in a kettle, they roast him on a spit and eat the roasted "sacrificial meat", but Athena rescues the still-beating heart from which (according to Olympiodorus) Zeus is able to recreate the god and bring him back to life.
	
The roasted "sacrificial meat" of Phanes may be associated to the Cannibal Hymn. The Cannibal Hymn preserves an early royal butchery ritual in Ancient Egypt, in which the deceased king , assisted by the god of wine Shezmu,  slaughters, cooks and eats the gods as sacrificial bulls, thereby incorporating in himself their divine powers in order that he might negotiate his passage into the Afterlife. These sacrificial bulls are also referred to Mithraism.  Through Mithraism and its lion headed figures, Phanes could also be associated to Ahura Mazda.

Kessler has argued that this cult of death and resurrection of Dionysus developed the 4th century CE. This cult and other sects this cult formed, together with Mithraism, are thought to have been in direct competition with early Christianity during late Antiquity.

See also
 Lucifer
 Mithraism in comparison with Phanes
 Phanes (coin issuer), the most ancient inscribed coin

Footnotes

References

Sources

External links

Greek deities
Greek gods
Fertility deities
Fertility gods
Creator deities
Creator gods
Ancient Greek religion
Androgynous and hermaphroditic deities
Intersex in religion and mythology
Greek primordial deities
Snakes in religion
Eros